is a Japanese manga series written and illustrated by Kakashi Oniyazu. It was serialized in Square Enix's seinen manga magazine Young Gangan from January 2019 to February 2019, with its chapters collected in six tankōbon volumes.

Publication
On February 27, 2019, it was announce that Oniyazu had died on February 2; Square Enix decided to cancel the series, making its 56th chapter, published on February 1, the last one. Square Enix collected its chapters in six tankōbon volumes, released from July 25, 2016, to April 25, 2019.

In North America, the manga was licensed for English release by Yen Press.

A spin-off manga, titled , written by Tsujimori and illustrated by Sake no. Marine, was serialized on Square Enix's Manga UP! app from October 26, 2018, to August 28, 2020. Square Enix collected its chapters in five tankōbon volumes, released from April 25, 2019, to October 7, 2020.

Volume list

References

Further reading

External links
 

Gangan Comics manga
Seinen manga
Yen Press titles